(born September 17, 1970) is a Japanese softball player who played first base and as a catcher in the Olympic Games from 1996 to 2004. For the team she won a silver medal in 2000 and the bronze medal in 2004. She also served as a coach for the gold medal winning team at the 2020 Summer Olympics.

References

Japanese softball players
Softball players at the 1996 Summer Olympics
Softball players at the 2000 Summer Olympics
Softball players at the 2004 Summer Olympics
Olympic softball players of Japan
Olympic silver medalists for Japan
Olympic bronze medalists for Japan
Living people
Olympic medalists in softball
1970 births
Place of birth missing (living people)
Asian Games medalists in softball
Softball players at the 1994 Asian Games
Softball players at the 1998 Asian Games
Softball players at the 2002 Asian Games
Medalists at the 1994 Asian Games
Medalists at the 1998 Asian Games
Medalists at the 2002 Asian Games
Asian Games gold medalists for Japan
Asian Games silver medalists for Japan
Medalists at the 2004 Summer Olympics
20th-century Japanese women